He Jiuying {Chinese: 何九盈; Pinyin: Hé Jiǔyíng; born 1932 ) was a professor at Beijing University Department of Chinese and is an expert on historical Chinese phonology. His son is He Li.

Biography
He Jiuying was born in Anren, Hunan.  He graduated from Beijing University in 1961 and then joined the faculty of Beijing University Department of Chinese.

Professor He is a leading expert on ancient Chinese language.  His published books include Gu Hanyu Yinyunxue Shuyao, Shanggu Yin, and Zhongguo Gudai Yuyanxue Shi.

Selected publications
1991: Historical Chinese Phonology, Commercial Press, 
1995: A History of Chinese Modern Linguistics, Guangdong Education Press, ; A History of Chinese Ancient Linguistics, Guangdong Education Press, 
2000: The Culture of Chinese Characters, Liaoning People's Press, .
2006: Yuyan Conggao, Commercial Press, .

Notes

External links
 Introduction to He Jiuying (Chinese)
 List of He Jiuying's publications (Chinese)

1932 births
Living people
Chinese phonologists
People from Chenzhou
Educators from Hunan
Writers from Hunan
Academic staff of Peking University